Merchandization is a critical term coined by the anti-globalization movement to designate the process of change in viewpoint of individuals or society towards an object, service or substance. Things that were formerly thought of as "simply being there", are now being thought of as commodities for sale and corporate profit.  This change in viewpoint is called merchandization of an object.

For example, anti-globalization and anti-capitalism activists claim that in today's society, many things, including health care, culture, and education, are becoming mere merchandise.

Marx discussed this "fetishism of commodities" in the nineteenth century.

In other words, something may have usefulness, but it has no value unless it can be exchanged in the marketplace for something else considered to have value. That value may come because it fills a need through consumption or being further exchanged. In this way, labor, time, and natural resources have come to serve the market instead of the other way around.

The slogan of ATTAC is "the World is not Merchandise" (le monde n'est pas une marchandise).

See also
Anti-capitalism

References

Anti-globalization movement
Political terminology